= Human trafficking in Central Europe =

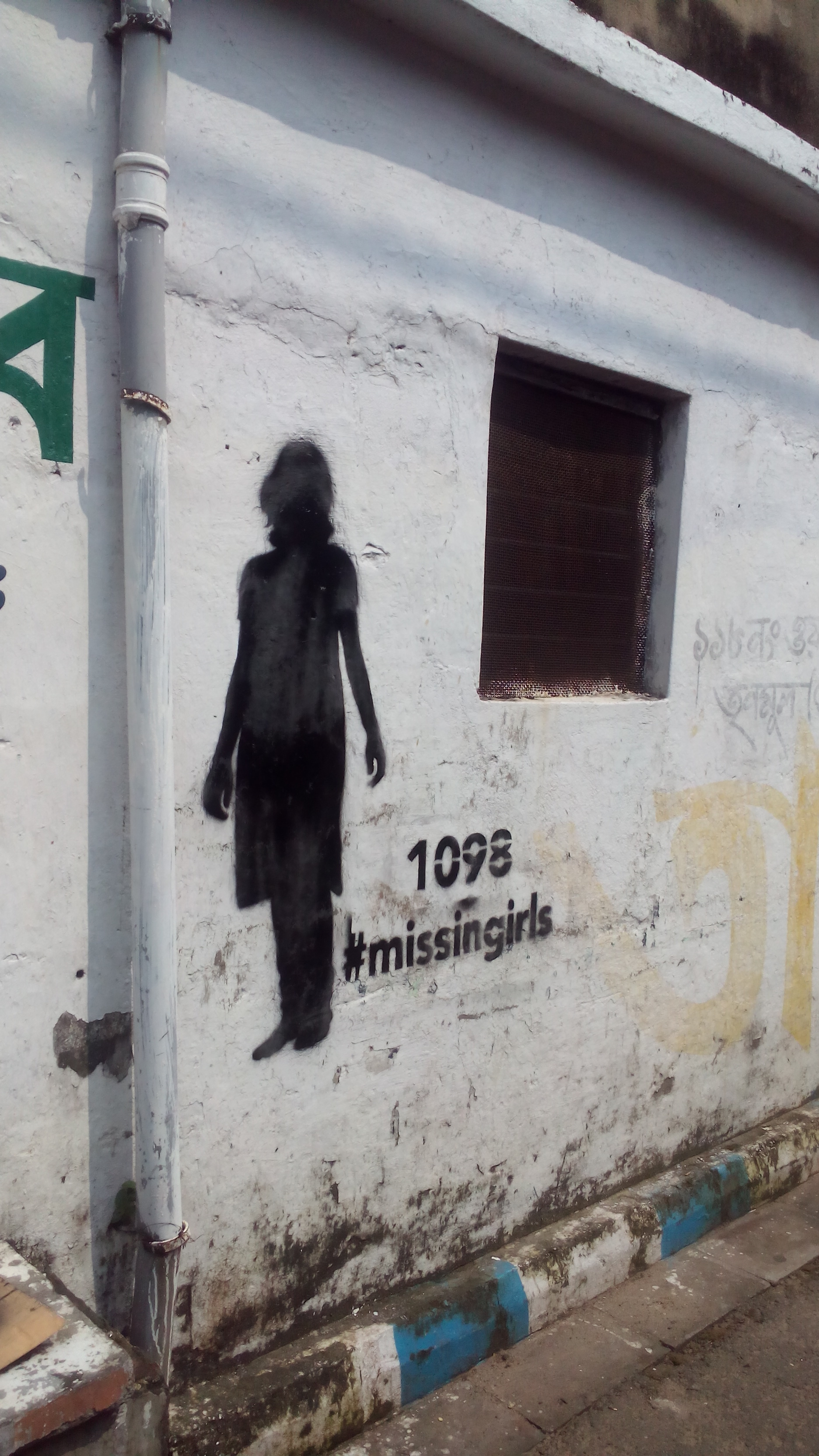
Stencil project by Missing girls

Human trafficking in Central Europe has become a significant legal and political issue, as it is thought that many victims of human trafficking come from Central Europe.

== Easier immigration after the fall of Communism ==
The fall of the Iron Curtain has permitted an easier movement of people in Europe. However, this movement has been accompanied by an increase in human trafficking by the organized crime. The victims of human traffickers are not free to pursue their business, but are usually compelled to work for the traffickers, typically in prostitution.

Areas in central and Eastern Europe are now exploited as recruiting and transit locations to the west as well as final destinations for human trafficking. “According to Lidove noviny, 16 cases of human trafficking were uncovered in the Czech Republic in 2005, while it was three cases fewer in 2004.

== Growth of modern-day slavery ==
Ten cases were registered by the police in 2003.” Despite the efforts of the international community, the modern day slavery is growing tremendously and is well covered up. Presently, women and children are the main victims of human trafficking. “Lydie Err, in her report to the Parliamentary Assembly, said that 78% of women victims of trafficking were from central or eastern Europe”.

Such figures arise due to the great unemployment especially among women, increased cross border movement, and corruption of local law enforcement organizations.

== Promises of marriage, jobs or education ==
Cases where criminals promise great education for children from poor families and then force them into labor have also been detected. "According to the French human rights organisation, Albania is the county most involved in the sex trade, with women and children being lured to go to the West with false promises of marriage, jobs or education".
